Morgane Charre (born 9 June 1990) is a French downhill mountain biker. 

She won the downhill event at the 2012 UCI Mountain Bike World Championships.

References

External links

1990 births
Living people
French female cyclists
Downhill mountain bikers
French mountain bikers
UCI Mountain Bike World Champions (women)